Donald Rhys Hubert Peers (10 July 1908 – 9 August 1973) was a popular Welsh singer. His best remembered rendition and signature song was "In a Shady Nook by a Babbling Brook".

Biography

Early life
Peers was born in the Welsh mining town of Ammanford, Carmarthenshire on 10 July 1908. His father was a colliery worker and a prominent member of the Plymouth Brethren who disapproved of the variety theatre, and never heard or saw his son work. Peers' family were hoping he would become a schoolteacher, but he had other ambitions and left home at the age of sixteen.

Peers travelled around the country working as a house painter and, for a time in January to March 1927, went to sea as a mess steward on ships.  In September 1927, he decided to enter show business and he made his debut in a concert party called "Tons of Fun" at the New Theatre in Lowestoft. He continued with the touring company in a show called "Comedy Concoctions - on Tour" for a few weeks until it disbanded.  He auditioned for the BBC and his first BBC Radio broadcast on 2LO took place on 17 December 1927, with the London Radio Dance Band. One of the songs he sang was, "In a Shady Nook by a Babbling Brook", which became his most requested song and, later, his signature tune.

Career
He made several more radio broadcasts and these led to him touring the variety stages in a concert party called "Pleasure" where he accompanied himself on the ukulele and also gave ukulele solos. He was engaged to appear in the "Babes in the Wood" pantomime at the Grand, Plymouth in December 1928.  Following that he went into a touring revue called "Spare Time" and received very good notices. His London debut took place in a revue at the Bedford Theatre in 1929. December 1929 found him back at the Grand, Plymouth where he starred in the pantomime "Cinderella" playing Dandini and then he toured in a revue called "Laugh, Hang It, Laugh". The latter half of 1930 was spent touring with another revue called " A Vaudeville Voyage" when he was described as a light comedian.

In May 1926. he met Gertrude Mary Thomson in Richmond, North Riding of Yorkshire and they eventually married on June 7, 1930  in Harrogate. Their daughter, Sheila, was born on April 25, 1931. He continued to tour with revues and with appearances on the variety stage and from February 1932 he was being billed as "The Laughing Cavalier of Song". In November and December 1932, he took part in two experimental television broadcasts playing banjo solos. In 1933, after an appearance on the BBC Music Hall programme booked as The Laughing Cavalier of Song,  he got a recording contract with HMV Records. He soon moved to Eclipse Records who sold through Woolworths on 8" records and he made a number of records for them during 1934 and 1935.

In 1940 Peers enlisted in the Royal Army Service Corps as a clerk, where he served until D-Day in 1944, when he was invalided out. When in service, he entertained his fellow troops in shows. He continued to make records for Decca during the war and in 1944 he recorded "In a Shady Nook by a Babbling Brook", written by E.G. Nelson and Harry Pease in 1927. 

Peers began a new radio series for the BBC's Light Programme on August 5th, 1947 and this was very successful over the next two years. It resulted in a string of hit records in the late 1940s with recordings such "I Can't Begin To Tell You", "Bow Bells", "Far Away Places", "On The 5.45" (a vocal version of "Twelfth Street Rag", with lyrics by Andy Razaf), "Powder Your Face With Sunshine" (one of his biggest successes), "Lavender Blue (Dilly Dilly)", "A Strawberry Moon (In A Blueberry Sky)", "Everywhere You Go", "Clancy Lowered the Boom", "It Happened in Adano", "A Rose in a Garden of Weeds", "I'll String Along with You" and "Down in the Glen". His popularity was such that on May 9, 1949 he performed his two-hour one-man show at the Royal Albert Hall in front of an enthusiastic crowd of 8692. Henry Hall booked him with Billy Russell and Norman Wisdom for a new show called Buttons & Bows which opened for a summer season at the Grand in Blackpool on June 20, 1949. Unfortunately Peers had to withdraw from the show at the end of August because of throat trouble. This led to a throat operation and he was unable to sing for six months.  He recovered to headline the London Palladium in August 1950 and he appeared in the Royal Variety Performance. on November 13 the same year.  Peers continued recording with songs such as, "The Last Mile Home", "Dear Hearts and Gentle People", "Out of a Clear Blue Sky", "Music! Music! Music!", "If I Knew You Were Comin' I'd've Baked a Cake", "Enjoy Yourself (It's Later Than You Think)", "Dearie", "I Remember the Cornfields", "Beloved, Be Faithful", "Me and My Imagination", "Mistakes", "In a Golden Coach" (a celebratory number for the Coronation of Queen Elizabeth II), "Is It Any Wonder" and "Changing Partners".

Peers found a favourable audience in Australia. In 1950 alone he placed the following 12 songs into Australia's Top 20: "Music! Music! Music! (Put Another Nickel In)", "I Told Them All About You", "(If I Knew You Were Comin') I'd've Baked a Cake", "Harry Lime Theme", "Twenty Four Hours of Sunshine", "Dearie", "Tennessee Waltz", "Enjoy Yourself (It's Later Than You Think)", "Oh, You Sweet One", "Rolling 'Round the World", "My Golden Baby", and "Daddy's Little Girl". On May 31, 1954, he went to Australia to tour and remained there for two and a half years. His wife and daughter did not accompany him and on his return in 1956 he announced that he was seeking a divorce. There was a maintenance dispute which was the subject of a legal battle but his wife would not agree to a divorce as she was a Roman Catholic. His long term partner became Kay O'Dwyer who managed his affairs and had accompanied him to Australia.

During his absence in Australia, his fans had forgotten him and the pop music scene had changed dramatically with the arrival of rock 'n' roll. He returned to TV and radio work but eventually Peers found work via the club circuit, which had taken over from the variety theatres. In May 1962, Peers was given his own BBC Wales television programme, Donald Peers Presents, and during the series he introduced Tom Jones and also scientist and writer Brian J. Ford, this time playing boogie piano. 

Peers kept busy with many guest appearances on TV shows and in February 1964 he became the compere of BBC TV's new "Club Night" programme, a 40-minute show televised from provincial social clubs with new and well-known entertainers. The show was very successful and he made 18 appearances over the next year or so. Shows for the BBC Light Programme and for BBC2 followed.
He made a comeback to the record charts with "Please Don't Go" (a ballad set to the tune of Offenbach's "Barcarolle" from The Tales of Hoffmann), which reached No. 3 in the UK Singles Chart in 1969. He made several appearances on BBC-TV's Top of the Pops in February 1969 to promote his record. Eddy Arnold had pop and country success with his cover version. This was followed by a string of singles and albums by Peers, but it was not until 1972 that he had another minor hit with "Give Me One More Chance", which reached the UK Top 40.

He suffered a serious accident in Australia in 1971 when he fell  and broke his back. The recovery took a long time and for a while he was confined to a wheelchair.

Films
He appeared in a couple of films.

The Balloon Goes Up (1942). Balloon unit WAAFs catch German spies. Peers played "Sergeant Jim" and sang "You've Gotta Smile". "I'll Soon Be Coming Home" and "Keep Looking for the Rainbow".

Sing Along with Me (1952). He played David Parry, a humble grocer who wins a radio song-writing contest. Peers sang "Take My Heart", "If You Smile at the Sun", "Hoop Diddle-i-do-ra-li-ay", "Down at the Old Village Hall" and "I Left My Heart in a Valley in Wales". The review in Kinematograph Weekly stated "The picture presents Donald Peers with a simple yet effective vehicle for his screen debut, and he returns the compliment by easily adapting his flawless stage, radio and TV technique to the even more exacting demands of the "flicks." His friendly approach offsets his years, close-ups hold no terror for him, and, like the experienced trouper he is, he sees that all the ditties have rousing choruses."

Later life
Peers died from bronchial pneumonia in a Hove nursing home on 9 August 1973 at the age of 65, with The Brighton & Hove Gazette and Herald announcing his demise. He was cremated in the Downs Crematorium, Brighton. His memorial tablet in the Garden of Remembrance, now weather-beaten, reads, 'Donald Peers, August 1973, Loved by Kates, "In a Shady Nook by a Babbling Brook"'.

Miscellaneous
In 1950 Peers knocked down and killed an elderly man in a road accident in Marylebone, London. He was cleared of any blame.

A keen golfer, Peers played in the British Amateur Championship at St. Andrews on May 22, 1950 but lost in the first round.

Peers' autobiography titled "Pathway" was published in 1951.

In 1954, Peers was sued by his former pianist Ernest John Ponticelli for arrears of salary of £490 and ultimately was required to pay just £200 to Mr. Ponticelli.

Discography

Singles

References

Bibliography
Peers, Donald (1951) Pathway, the autobiography, London Werner Laurie, 1951: ASIN B0017D2D0O
Nobbs, George (1971) The Wireless Stars Wensum Books, ASIN: B01MCYF173
Busby, Roy (1976) British Music Hall – An Illustrated Who's Who from 1850 to the Present Day Hofer Collins,

External links
 Donald Peers – The 1950s Pop Idol
 
 

1908 births
1973 deaths
Welsh crooners
20th-century Welsh male singers
Traditional pop music singers
People from Ammanford
British Army personnel of World War II
Royal Army Service Corps soldiers